Aris Harry Theofiledes (born April 19, 1944) is a former American football quarterback in the National Football League.  After playing college football at Waynesburg College, Theofiledes played for the Washington Redskins during the 1968 season. As a back-up to Sonny Jurgensen, Theofiledes managed to see action in five games, completing 11 of 20 passes and throwing for two touchdowns.

Awards
1969 Official All-ACFL
1971 Official All-ACFL
1971 ACFL Offensive Most Valuable Player

1944 births
Living people
American people of Greek descent
Washington Redskins players
American football quarterbacks
Players of American football from Pennsylvania
People from Homestead, Pennsylvania